Kheyrgu Rural District is a rural district (dehestan) in Alamarvdasht District, Lamerd County, Fars Province, Iran. At the 2006 census, its population was 6,259, in 1,314 families.  The rural district has 22 villages.

References 

Rural Districts of Fars Province
Lamerd County